Andreas Stavrou (born 1 March 1958) is a retired Cypriot football defender.

References

1958 births
Living people
Cypriot footballers
APOEL FC players
Doxa Drama F.C. players
Association football forwards
Cypriot First Division players
Cypriot expatriate footballers
Expatriate footballers in Greece
Cypriot expatriate sportspeople in Greece
Cyprus international footballers